Lilly the Witch (also known as Lilly in the UK) is an animated television show based on the Lilli the Witch book series by German author, Knister. The first season debuted on TVOKids in Canada on 4 September 2004, and later premiered on KiKA in Germany one month later. The second season debuted in 2007 in both languages as well. The third season was only broadcast in German and featured a different animation style.

Plot
Lilly the Witch focuses on the adventures of the titular character, an average young girl who one day stumbles upon an ancient, magical book and befriends its caretaker, Hector, a chubby dragon who comes to life and initiates her with the power of magic. Together, the two time travel all around the world.

Characters

Main
 Lilly is a 9-year-old average girl who stumbles upon a magical book. She experiences many wild adventures that take her all around the world.
 Hector is a cheeky little green dragon who is an expert at magic. He is also Lilly's friend and companion who accompanies her in all her adventures.
 Leon is Lilly's little brother.

Recurring

Production

Lilly the Witch was produced by Trixter Productions in Germany, Vivatoon (Hector) Inc. in Canada, and Magma Films in Ireland for the first two seasons. 7 years after the second season was released, a third season of the series premiered on 26 September 2014 in Germany. The third season was produced by Trixter Entertainment in Germany, Dor Film in Austria, and AT-Anim in Belgium, with co-producer credits given to Westdeutscher Rundfunk, ARD, and Trixter Productions in Germany, ORF in Austria, and Umedia in Belgium. As the first two seasons had a simplified animation style using traditional cel animation, this new season used a more detailed digital animation style using Flash animation. The crew of the series was mostly changed due to the studio switches, and Lilly's new design is much closer to the original books.

Episodes

Series overview

Season 1 (2004)

Season 2 (2007)

Season 3 (2014)

Broadcast
Lilly the Witch debuted on TVOKids in Canada on 4 September 2004. It also aired on CBBC in the UK on 6 September. The series later premiered in the German language on KiKA in Germany on 14 October 2004, and would continue to air the third season in 2014. The first two seasons also aired on CBBC in the United Kingdom between 25 April and 4 November 2007 with the title "Lilly", and a revised theme song omitting any mention of her being a witch.

References

External links
 
  on CBBC

2004 German television series debuts
2014 German television series endings
2000s animated television series
Anime-influenced Western animated television series
German children's animated television series
German-language television shows
Animated television series about children
Television series about witchcraft
Television shows based on children's books
YTV (Canadian TV channel) original programming
Nickelodeon original programming
BBC children's television shows